Chen Xizi (born 16 November 2001) is a Chinese ice dancer. Along with partner Xing Jianing, she is the 2022 Chinese champion.

Programs

Competitive highlights 
With Xing

Detailed results
Small medals for short program and free skating are awarded only at ISU Championships. At team events, medals are awarded for team results only. ISU personal bests are highlighted in bold.

Senior level

References

2001 births
Chinese female ice dancers
Living people
21st-century Chinese people